Baldvinsson is an Icelandic patronymic surname, literally meaning "son of Baldvin". Notable people with the name include:

Baldvin Baldvinsson (born 1943), Icelandic footballer
Guðjón Baldvinsson (born 1986), Icelandic footballer
Marel Baldvinsson (born 1980), Icelandic footballer
Rógvi Baldvinsson (born 1989), Faroese footballer

Icelandic-language surnames